Joseph Doyle (1894 – unknown) was an English professional rugby league footballer who played in the 1910s and 1920s.

Background
Joe Doyle's birth was registered in Barrow-in-Furness district, Lancashire, England.

Playing career
Doyle represented Great Britain in eight non-Test matches on the 1920 Great Britain rugby league tour of Australia and New Zealand, scoring eight tries.

References

External links
Barrow RL’s great Britons

1890s births
Barrow Raiders players
English rugby league players
Great Britain national rugby league team players
Place of death missing
Rugby league centres
Rugby league wingers
Rugby league players from Barrow-in-Furness
Year of death missing